The UNAF U-17 Tournament is a football (soccer) tournament held between nations who are members of the UNAF association, however some other teams which are not members are invited.

Summaries

UNAF U-17 Tournament

UNAF U-16 Tournament

Performances by countries

* hosts.
° Second tournament

See also
 UNAF U-23 Tournament
 UNAF U-20 Tournament
 UNAF U-18 Tournament
 UNAF U-15 Tournament

References

External links
 UNAF U-17 Tournament history - unaf official website

 
UNAF competitions
Under-17 association football